Johan Martin Frederick "Edrich" Lubbe  (born 29 July 1969) is a South African former rugby union player.

Playing career
Lubbe matriculated at the Robertson High School and represented  at the annual Craven Week tournament in 1987. In 1990 he enrolled at the University of Stellenbosch and represented Maties on the rugby field.

Lubbe played two test matches for the Springboks. His debut was against  at Newlands in 1997, following with the first test against the touring British Lions team, also at Newlands.

Test history

See also
List of South Africa national rugby union players – Springbok no. 650

References

1969 births
Living people
South African rugby union players
South Africa international rugby union players
Western Province (rugby union) players
Free State Cheetahs players
Griquas (rugby union) players
Rugby union players from the Western Cape
Rugby union centres
Rugby union fly-halves